Rama rama is a species of bagrid catfish endemic to India where it is found in the Brahmaputra River basin.  It is the only member of its genus.

References
 

Bagridae
Taxa named by Francis Buchanan-Hamilton
Fish of Asia
Fish of India
Fish described in 1822